San Miguel Island is an island in the province of Albay in the Philippines located at the western end of the strip of islands in Lagonoy Gulf. The island is under the jurisdiction of the city of Tabaco, and comprises five barangays: Agnas, Hacienda, Rawis, Sagurong and Visita. The main economic activities are farming, fishing, basket and mat weaving, and cattle raising.

Islands of Albay